Orly Castel-Bloom is an Israeli author.

Biography
Orly Castel-Bloom was born in Northern Tel Aviv in 1960, to a family of French-speaking Egyptian Jews. Until the age of three, she had French nannies and spoke only French. She studied film at Tel Aviv University and theater at the Beit Zvi School for the Performing Arts in Ramat Gan.

Castel-Bloom lives in Tel Aviv and has two children. She has lectured at the universities of Harvard, UCLA, Cambridge and Oxford and currently teaches creative writing at Tel Aviv University.

Literary career
Castel-Bloom's first collection of short stories, Not Far from the Center of Town (Lo Rahok mi-Merkhaz ha-Ir), was published in 1987 by Am Oved. She is the author of 11 books, including collections of short fiction and novels. Her 1992 novel Dolly City, has been included in the UNESCO Collection of Representative Works, and in 1999 she was named one of the fifty most influential women in Israel. Dolly City has been performed as a play in Tel Aviv.

In Free Radicals (Radikalim Hofshiyim) published in 2002, Castel-Bloom stopped writing in the first-person. In Human Parts (Halakim Enoshiyim) published in 2002, she was the first Israeli novelist to address the subject of Palestinian suicide bombings. Her anthology of short stories You Don't Argue with Rice, was published in 2003. Castel-Bloom has won the Prime Minister's award twice, the Tel Aviv award for fiction and was nominated for the Sapir Prize for Literature.

Israeli literary critic Gershon Shaked called her a postmodern writer who "communicates the despair of a generation which no longer even dreams the dreams of Zionist history."

Awards and recognition
Castel-Bloom won the Prime Minister's Prize for Hebrew Literary Works in both 2001 and 2011, and the prestigious Sapir Prize for Literature for An Egyptian Novel in 2015.

See also
Israeli literature
Women of Israel

References

External links
 Orly Castel-Bloom bio via ithl.org

1960 births
Living people
Jewish women writers
Jewish Israeli writers
Israeli women short story writers
Israeli women novelists
20th-century Israeli women writers
21st-century Israeli women writers
Writers from Tel Aviv
Israeli people of Egyptian-Jewish descent
Tel Aviv University alumni
Academic staff of Tel Aviv University
Recipients of Prime Minister's Prize for Hebrew Literary Works